Sheikh Kamal International Stadium, also known as Cox's Bazar Cricket Stadium, is a newly developed cricket stadium in the tourist town of Cox's Bazar, Bangladesh.

It was built on leased land from Cox's Bazar Golf Course. The stadium was a shortlisted venue for the 2014 ICC World Twenty20, however it did not host any matches due to the construction of the ground not finishing in time for the tournament.

History
The first match played at the stadium was a Women's One Day International match between Bangladesh and Pakistan on 5 March 2014. It hosted 2 matches of Under-19 One Day International between Bangladesh U-19 and South Africa U-19. Those 2 matches won by one each.
Currently the venue is being used to host Under-19 One Day and Unofficial test matches played by Bangladesh U-19 and Bangladesh A team.

Since 2016 Under-19 Cricket World Cup, the venue was occasionally used for the training of women’s and Under-19 team members while some games of High-Performance Unit also took place.

2016 ICC Under-19 Cricket World Cup
It was one of the seven venues of 2016 ICC Under-19 Cricket World Cup. The venue has hosted 17 group matches of the tournament including 8 matches played at academy ground.

See also

Stadiums in Bangladesh
List of cricket grounds in Bangladesh
Sheikh Kamal International Stadium, Gopalganj
Cox's Bazar Stadium

References

External links
 Sheikh Kamal International Stadium, Cox's Bazar at CricketArchive
 Sheikh Kamal International Cricket Stadium No 2 Ground, Cox's Bazar at CricketArchive
 "Bangladesh cricket's seaside hope"

Cricket grounds in Bangladesh
Sport in Bangladesh
Cox's Bazar
Bangladeshi culture